Graham Minihan (9 September 1934 – 29 September 1991) was  a former Australian rules footballer who played with St Kilda in the Victorian Football League (VFL).

Notes

External links 
		

1934 births
1991 deaths
Australian rules footballers from Victoria (Australia)
St Kilda Football Club players
Castlemaine Football Club players